Prosečka Vas is a village in the Municipality of Puconci in the Prekmurje region of Slovenia.

References

External links
Prosečka Vas on Geopedia

Populated places in the Municipality of Puconci